, also known by Toei's own English title The Strongest Guy in the World, is a 1990 Japanese animated science fiction martial arts film and the second feature film in the Dragon Ball Z franchise. It was originally released in Japan on March 10 between episodes 39 and 40 of DBZ, at the "Toei Manga Matsuri" film festival along with the second Akuma-kun film (Welcome to Devil Land) and the 1990 film version of Sally the Witch.

Plot

Gohan and Oolong search for the magical Dragon Balls and their radar shows them that the orbs are being gathered by another, unknown party. They investigate near a large wall of ice where Piccolo is training. Meanwhile, the mad scientist Dr. Kochin, having successfully gathered all of the Dragon Balls, summons the eternal dragon Shenron and wishes for Dr. Wheelo and his lab to be released from the ice. The ice breaks away as a building emerges and Gohan and Oolong are attacked by Dr. Kochin's "bio-men". Piccolo saves them but is overcome by three mysterious warriors while Gohan and Oolong escape.

Dr. Kochin and his bio-men soon present themselves to Master Roshi who refuses to accompany them to Wheelo's lab and defeats the bio-men. Dr. Kochin kidnaps Bulma to force Master Roshi to pursue them. At Wheelo's lab, Master Roshi is forced to fight three "bio-warriors" but is swiftly defeated. Bulma discovers that Dr. Wheelo's mission is to obtain the body of the strongest warrior on Earth to become the host for his brain, which is currently separated from his deceased body and kept alive by his advanced technology. Bulma informs him that Goku will undoubtedly be coming to rescue them and that he is much more powerful than Roshi. Meanwhile, Goku learns of situation and he arrives at Dr. Wheelo's lab and is confronted by Mikokatsun, Kishime, and Ebifurya – Dr. Kochin's three bio-warrior henchmen. Goku defeats Mikokatsun but is frozen by an ice-like attack launched by Ebifurya. Gohan and Krillin arrive to  help but are no match for Kishime. Goku breaks free from ice with his Kaio-ken technique, defeats the two remaining bio-warriors, and confronts Dr. Wheelo. Piccolo, who has been brainwashed by Dr. Wheelo, attacks Goku. Gohan tries to stop Piccolo but fails, causing his anger to explode, shattering Dr. Wheelo's brainwashing device. Dr. Wheelo is stunned by Gohan's power and desires to steal his body instead. He breaks his robot body free from the ice wall, subsequently knocking Dr. Kochin down a shaft which kills him.

Dr. Wheelo attacks, overwhelms the fighters, and only Goku and Piccolo are left to oppose him. Goku knocks Dr. Wheelo into the atmosphere and begins to form a Spirit Bomb attack. Wheelo interrupts him before he can finish gathering the energy for it requiring Goku's allies to distract Wheelo. Goku's successfully launches the bomb and Wheelo is killed.

Cast

A fourth English dub, produced and released exclusively in Malaysia by Speedy Video, features an unknown voice cast.

Music
OP (Opening Theme):
 "Cha-La Head-Cha-La"
 Lyrics by Yukinojō Mori
 Music by Chiho Kiyooka
 Arranged by Kenji Yamamoto
 Performed by Hironobu Kageyama
IN (Insert Song):
 
 Lyrics by 
 Music by 
 Arranged by Kenji Yamamoto
 Performed by Masako Nozawa
ED (Ending Theme):
 
 Lyrics by Dai Satō
 Music by 
 Arranged by Kenji Yamamoto
 Performed by Hironobu Kageyama

English dub soundtracks
The Toonami version replaced "Cha-La Head-Cha-La" and "Ikusa" with Jeremy Sweet's "Rock the Dragon" but kept the original Japanese background music, including the insert song "I Lo~ve Mr. Piccolo♡". Home video releases of the Pioneer dub left "Cha-La Head-Cha-La" and "Ikusa" intact.

The score for the 2006 English dub's composed by Nathan Johnson. The Double Feature release contains an alternate audio track containing the English dub with original Japanese background music by Shunsuke Kikuchi and the original ending theme, "Ikusa".

Box office

Overseas in Europe, the film grossed $1,009,767 in Germany, Austria and Poland during 20022003.

Releases
It was released on VHS and DVD in North America on May 26, 1998, with an English dub, produced by Pioneer Entertainment in association with Funimation. Pioneer's dub used the original Ocean Productions voice cast of the TV series. Since then, Funimation was released the Ocean dub of the film on the Rock the Dragon Edition DVD set on August 13, 2013, it has 53 edited episodes of the TV series, plus two edited films of Dead Zone and The Tree of Might as they aired on Toonami.

Once their sub-license expired, Funimation also released the film to DVD in "Ultimate Uncut Edition" on November 14, 2006 as part of a film set subtitled "First Strike", also containing Dead Zone (1989) and The Tree of Might (1990), with completely new dub done by Funimation's voice cast. It was later released in Double Feature set along with Dead Zone (1989) for Blu-ray and DVD on May 27, 2008, both feature full 1080p format in HD remastered 16:9 aspect ratio and an enhanced 5.1 surround mix. The film was re-released to DVD in remastered thinpak collection on November 1, 2011, containing the first 5 Dragon Ball Z films.

Reception

Other companies
A fourth English version released exclusively in Malaysia by Speedy Video features an unknown cast.

Outside of the United States, there have been two other English dubs of this film: one in Malaysia and one by AB Groupe in France. The Malaysian English dub was released to VCD in Malaysia, while AB Groupe's English dub aired on TV in the Netherlands, the United Kingdom, and Ireland, as well as seeing a home release to VHS and DVD in some of the formerly mentioned countries. Both dubs use Toei's official English title rather than Funimation's title, and until recently, the voice cast of the AB Groupe dub version was unknown, but then it has been determined that they used voice actors who were involved in French TV shows like Code Lyoko, while the Malaysian dub's cast remains unknown.

References

External links
 Official anime website of Toei Animation

1990 films
1990 anime films
Worlds Strongest
Films directed by Daisuke Nishio
Funimation
Geneon USA
Films about genetic engineering
Toei Animation films
Films scored by Shunsuke Kikuchi
Japanese animated fantasy films
Japanese fantasy adventure films